Preston E. Sullivan (born June 8, 1947) is an American Democratic politician. He is a former member of the Mississippi House of Representatives from the 22nd District. He served for four terms from 2004 to 2020 and did not run again in 2019.

References

1947 births
Living people
Politicians from Tupelo, Mississippi
Democratic Party members of the Mississippi House of Representatives
21st-century American politicians